Arthur Frank Bultman (September 16, 1907 – February 19, 1967) was an American football center in the National Football League who played for the Brooklyn Dodgers and the Green Bay Packers.  Bultman played collegiate ball for Indiana University and Marquette University.  He played professionally for 4 seasons in the NFL before retiring in 1934. He died in 1967.

References

1907 births
1967 deaths
American football centers
Indiana Hoosiers football players
Green Bay Packers players
Marquette Golden Avalanche football players
Sportspeople from Green Bay, Wisconsin
Players of American football from Wisconsin